Jean-François Hébert (born August 17, 1972 in Warwick, Quebec - died November 28, 2018) was a Canadian competitive figure skater who appeared in men's singles. He won bronze medals at the 1993 Nebelhorn Trophy and 1999 Canadian Championships. He also represented Canada at the 1999 Four Continents Championships, where he placed 11th.

Programs

Competitive highlights 
GP: Champions Series / Grand Prix

Death 
He died on November 28, 2018.

References 

1972 births
2018 deaths
Canadian male single skaters
People from Centre-du-Québec
20th-century Canadian people
21st-century Canadian people